Randsburg (formerly Rand Camp) is a census-designated place (CDP) in Kern County, California, United States. The population was 69 in the 2010 census, down from 77 in the 2000 census.

Geography

It is on the west side of U.S. Route 395 between Kramer Junction to the south and Ridgecrest to the north. Randsburg is in the Rand Mountains, and is separated by a ridge from the neighboring community of Johannesburg.

Climate
Randsburg has a cold semi-arid climate (BSk) found on the western edge of the Mojave Desert with very hot, dry summers and cool winters.

History
 
Gold was discovered at Yellow Aster Mine in 1895 and a mining camp quickly formed named Rand Camp. Both mine and camp were named after the gold mining region in South Africa. The first post office at Randsburg opened in 1896.

Tourism
The town has an influx of tourists throughout the year. Most visitors arrive between autumn and spring due to the extreme heat in summer. The annual Western Days Celebration starts in the third weekend of September, where the town hosts events such as gun fights, panning for gold, live bands, dances and vendors.  During Thanksgiving and New Year's Day weekend, off-roading enthusiasts visit via the town's legal off-roading trail.  Local shops are usually closed on weekdays, and open during weekends.

Demographics

2010
At the 2010 census Randsburg had a population of 69. The racial makeup of Randsburg was 62 (89%) White, 0 African American, 4 (6%) Native American, 2 (3%) Asian, 0 Pacific Islander, 0 from other races, and 1 (1%) from two or more races. Hispanic or Latino of any race were 2 people (3%).

The whole population lived in households, no one lived in non-institutionalized group quarters and no one was institutionalized. 0 lived in non-institutionalized group quarters, and 0 were institutionalized.

There were 42 households, 1 (2%) had children under the age of 18 living in them, 13 (31%) were opposite-sex married couples living together, 4 (10%) had a female householder with no husband present, 0 had a male householder with no wife present.  There were 5 (12%) unmarried opposite-sex partnerships, and 3 (7%) same-sex married couples or partnerships. 17 households (41%) were one person and 6 (14%) had someone living alone who was 65 or older. The average household size was 1.6.  There were 17 families (41% of households); the average family size was 2.1.

The age distribution was 2 people (3%) under the age of 18, 2 people (3%) aged 18 to 24, 5 people (7%) aged 25 to 44, 37 people (54%) aged 45 to 64, and 23 people (33%) who were 65 or older.  The median age was 59.1 years. For every 100 females, there were 68.3 males.  For every 100 females age 18 and over, there were 67.5 males.

There were 97 housing units at an average density of 49.9 per square mile, of the occupied units 39 (93%) were owner-occupied and 3 (7%) were rented. The homeowner vacancy rate was 2%; the rental vacancy rate was 50%.  64 people (93% of the population) lived in owner-occupied housing units and 5 people (7%) lived in rental housing units.

2000
At the 2000 census there were 77 people, 49 households, and 22 families in the CDP. The racial makeup of the CDP was 86% White, 5% Native American, 4% from other races, and 5% from two or more races. 5% of the population were Hispanic or Latino of any race.
Of the 49 households 4% had children under the age of 18 living with them, 43% were married couples living together, and 53% were non-families. 49% of households were one person and 25% were one person aged 65 or older. The average household size was 1.6 and the average family size was 2.1.

The age distribution was 4% under the age of 18, 3% from 18 to 24, 16% from 25 to 44, 48% from 45 to 64, and 30% 65 or older. The median age was 57 years. For every 100 females, there were 92.5 males. For every 100 females age 18 and over, there were 94.7 males.

The median household income was $48,000 and the median family income  was $49,875. Males had a median income of $53,750 versus $21,250 for females. The per capita income for the CDP was $23,602. None of the population and none of the families were below the poverty line.

Film and video
The lost 1913 movie The Mystery of Yellow Aster Mine was filmed in Randsburg.

South of Suez, starring George Brent and released in November 1940, was filmed in Randsburg.

The video for Calvin Harris's platinum single, Feel So Close, was filmed in part in Randsburg. Dwight Yoakam's 1989 video for "Long White Cadillac" was also filmed in the town.

Rand Mining District

In Randsburg is California Historical Landmark number 938, the Rand Mining District signed October 12, 1958. The area was home to the Rand Mining District which included the Yellow Aster Mine and the Kelly Mine. The mines started the town of Randsburg in 1895 and later the town of Johannesburg, California and Atolia, California.  The Rand Mine produced more silver than any mine in California.  The mine closed in 1929 as it was no longer profitable. 

In January of 1898 Randsburg Railway opened. It ran from Johannesburg to Kramer Junction, California with a stop at Atolia.

Rand Mining District California Historical Landmark reads:
NO. 938 RAND MINING DISTRICT - The Yellow Aster, or Rand, mine was discovered in April 1895 by Singleton, Burcham, and Mooers. The town of Randsburg quickly developed, followed by the supply town of Johannesburg in 1896. Both names were adopted from the profusion of minerals resembling those of the ranch mining district in South Africa. In 1907, Churchill discovered tungsten in Atolia. In June 1919, Williams and Nosser discovered the California Rand Silver Mine at Red Mountain.

See also
 California Historical Landmarks in Kern County
California Historical Landmark

References

External links

 Randsburg photo gallery at Western Mining History

History of Kern County, California
Census-designated places in Kern County, California
Mining in California
Populated places in the Mojave Desert
Populated places established in 1895
Census-designated places in California
1895 establishments in California